Svein Dag Hauge (born 23 October 1956 in Årdal, Norway) is a Norwegian jazz musician (guitar) and record producer, known from the band Lava and numerous recordings as a studio musician.

Career 
His early career began in Olav Stedje Band «Compact» (1973). In addition, he has been a key producer for such Olav Stedje, contributed with Jahn Teigen, Trond-Viggo Torgersen, Dollie de Luxe, Marius Müller, Randi Hansen, Ketil Stokkan, Bobbysocks, Torhild Nigar, Hilde Heltberg and Tre Busserulls.  Recently, he has been responsible for productions at Den Norske Opera (Izzat, 2006).

In 1986, he produced the album A Matter of Attitude by Danish heavy rockers Fate.

He received the diploma, one of the jury's special awards during Spellemannprisen 1981, as well as receiving Gammleng-prisen 1985 in the class Studio.

Honors 
1981: Spellemannprisen the jurys special award
1984: Spellemannprisen in the class Pop, within Lava
1985: Gammleng-prisen in the class Studio

Discography

Solo albums 
Within Lava
1980: Lava (Polydor Records) 
1981: Cruisin (Polydor Records)
1982: Prime Time (Polydor Records) 
1984: Fire (Polydor Records)
1985: Prime Cuts (Polydor Records), Compilation
1990: Rhythm of Love (Polydor Records)
1996: The Very Best of Lava (Polydor Records), Compilation
2003: Polarity (Polydor Records)
2005: Alibi (Polydor Records)
2009: Symphonic Journey (Polydor Records), live album

Collaborations 
With Olav Stedje
1981: Ta Meg Med (Hot Line)
1982: Tredje Stedje (Hot Line)
2006: Livstegn (Tylden & Co)
2011: Ikkje Utan Deg (Tylden & Co)

With Jahn Teigen
1979: En Dags Pause (RCA Victor)
1983: Friendly (RCA Victor), featuring Anita Skorgan

With Alex
1979: Hello I Love You! (Mercury Records)

With Trond Granlund
1981: Pleasant Surprise (CBS Records)
1982: Stay The Night (CBS Records)

With Eigil Berg
1981: Alhambra (Mercury Records)

With George Keller
1981: Resten Kan Du Tenke Deg (Snowflake Skandinavisk Artist Produksjon)

With Anita Skorgan
1981: Pastell (Snowflake Skandinavisk Artist Produksjon)
1985: Karma (Sonet Records)

With Kjell Fjalsett
1982: Forandring (New Song)

With Ketil Bjørnstad
1983: Aniara (Slagerfabrikken), Rock opera
2006: Coastlines, feat. Lill Lindfors

Within Prima Vera
1983: Her Kommer Olavs Menn'''' (Sonet Records)

With Terje Bakke & Test 1
1983: Høyt Spill (Test Records)

With Rust
1983: Rust (EMI Records)

Within Silhouette
1984: Silhouette (RCA Victor)

With Egil Eldøen
1985: Welcome Into My Heart (Sonet Records)
1988: Here We Go Again (Sonet Records)

With Lill Lindfors
1985: Människors Makt (Slagerfabrikken)

Within Mr. Walker And The Walkmen
1985: Walking (CBS Records)

Within CCCP
1985: Let's Spend The Night Together (Plateselskapet)

With Pål Thowsen
1986: Call Me Stranger (Polydor Records)

With Sissel Kyrkjebø
1986: Sissel (Noahs Ark)
1986: Glade Jul (Noahs Ark)
1994: Se Ilden Lyse (Forenede Fonogramprodusenter)

With Kate Gulbrandsen
1987: The Beauty And The Beat (Mariann Records)

With Jørn Hoel
1987: Varme Ut Av Is (Polydor Records)

With Eyvind Skeie and Sigvald Tveit
1987: Det Gode Landet (Fablos Records)

With Rita Eriksen
1988: Back From Wonderland (Desperado Records)

With Scott & Steel
1988: Scott & Steel (Self Release)

With Halvdan Sivertsen
1990: Førr Ei Dame (Plateselskapet)

With Geirr Lystrup and Maj Britt Andersen
1990: Maurits Og Den Store Barnålkrigen (Juni Records)

With Dag Kolsrud
1991: December II (MD Records)

With Elisabeth Andreassen
1992: Stemninger (Polydor Records)

With Silje Vige
1993: Alle Mine Tankar (Kirkelig Kulturverksted)

With Andrew Matheson
1993: Night Of The Bastard Moon (MCA Records)

With Tom Pacheco
1994: Robert And Ramona Single (Sonet Records)

With Hilde Heltberg
1997: Blant Konger Og Lus (Mega Records)

With Annbjørg Lien
1999: Baba Yaga (Grappa Music)

With Dollie de Luxe
2005: Rock Vs. Opera'' (Grappa Music)

References

Living people
1956 births
Musicians from Årdal
Spellemannprisen winners
Jazz-pop guitarists
Norwegian jazz guitarists
Norwegian jazz composers
Norwegian record producers
Lava (band) members